Young adult fiction (YA) is a category of fiction written for readers from 12 to 18 years of age. While the genre is primarily targeted at adolescents, approximately half of YA readers are adults.

The subject matter and genres of YA correlate with the age and experience of the protagonist. The genres available in YA are expansive and include most of those found in adult fiction. Common themes related to YA include friendship, first love, relationships, and identity. Stories that focus on the specific challenges of youth are sometimes referred to as problem novels or coming-of-age novels.

Young adult fiction was developed to soften the transition between children's novels and adult literature.

History

Beginning

The history of young adult literature is tied to the history of how childhood and young adulthood has been perceived. One early writer to recognize young adults as a distinct age group was Sarah Trimmer, who, in 1802, described "young adulthood" as lasting from ages 14 to 21. In her children's literature periodical, The Guardian of Education, Trimmer introduced the terms "Books for Children" (for those under fourteen) and "Books for Young Persons" (for those between fourteen and twenty-one), establishing terms of reference for young adult literature that still remain in use. Nineteenth- and early twentieth-century authors present several early works that appealed to young readers, though not necessarily written for them such as Lewis Carroll, Robert Louis Stevenson, Mark Twain, Francis Hodgson Burnett, Edith Nesbit, JM Barrie, L. Frank Baum, Astrid Lindgren, Enid Blyton, and CS Lewis.

20th century
Though young adult literature had existed since at least Laura Ingalls Wilder's Little House series, which was published in the 1930s, teachers and librarians were slow to accept books for adolescents as a genre.

The Heinlein juveniles were science fiction novels written by Robert A. Heinlein for Scribner's young-adult line, beginning with Rocket Ship Galileo in 1947. Scribner's published eleven more between 1947 and 1958, but rejected the thirteenth, Starship Troopers. That one was instead published by Putnam. The intended market was teenage boys, but a fourteenth novel, Podkayne of Mars (1963), featuring a young girl as the protagonist, is sometimes listed as a "Heinlein juvenile", although Heinlein himself did not consider it to be one.

In the 1950s, The Catcher in the Rye (1951) attracted the attention of the adolescent demographic although it was written for adults. The themes of adolescent angst and alienation in the novel have become synonymous with young adult literature.

A Wrinkle in Time, written by Madeleine L'Engle in 1960, received over twenty-six rejections before publication in 1962, due in part to it being neither a children's nor adult's book, and featuring a teenage girl as the protagonist at a time when most science fiction targeted teenage boys.

The modern classification of young-adult fiction originated during the 1960s, after the publication of S. E. Hinton's The Outsiders (1967). The novel features a truer, darker side of adolescent life that was not often represented in works of fiction of the time, and was the first novel published specifically marketed for young adults as Hinton was one when she wrote it. Written during high school and published when Hinton was only 16, The Outsiders also lacked the nostalgic tone common in books about adolescents written by adults. The Outsiders remains one of the best-selling young adult novels of all time.

Author and academic Michael Cart argues that the 1960s was the decade when literature for adolescents "could be said to have come into its own". This increased the discussions about adolescent experiences and the new idea of adolescent authors. In the late 1960s and early 1970s, five very popular books were published: I Know Why the Caged Bird Sings (1969), an autobiography of the early years of American poet Maya Angelou; The Friends (1973) by Rosa Guy; the semi-autobiographical The Bell Jar (US 1963, under a pseudonym; UK 1967) by poet Sylvia Plath; Bless the Beasts and Children (1970) by Glendon Swarthout; and Deathwatch (1972) by Robb White, which was awarded 1973 Edgar Award for Best Juvenile Mystery by the Mystery Writers of America. The works of Angelou and Plath were not written for young readers.

As publishers began to focus on the emerging adolescent market, booksellers and libraries began creating young adult sections distinct from children's literature and novels written for adults. The 1970s to the mid-1980s have been described as the golden age of young-adult fiction, when challenging novels began speaking directly to the interests of the identified adolescent market.

In the 1980s, young adult literature began pushing the envelope in terms of the subject matter that was considered appropriate for their audience: Books dealing with topics such as rape, suicide, parental death, and murder which had previously been deemed taboo, saw significant critical and commercial success. A flip-side of this trend was a strong revived interest in the romance novel, including young adult romance. With an increase in number of adolescents, the genre "matured, blossomed, and came into its own, with the better written, more serious, and more varied young adult books (than those) published during the last two decades".

The first novel in J.K. Rowling's seven-book Harry Potter series, Harry Potter and the Philosopher's Stone, was published in 1997. The series was praised for its complexity and maturity, and attracted a wide adult audience. While not technically YA, its success led many to see Harry Potter and its author, J.K. Rowling, as responsible for a resurgence of young adult literature, and re-established the pre-eminent role of speculative fiction in the field, a trend further solidified by The Hunger Games trilogy by Suzanne Collins. The end of the decade saw a number of awards appear such as the Michael L. Printz Award and Alex Awards, designed to recognize excellence in writing for young adult audiences.

The category of young adult fiction continues to expand into other media and genres: graphic novels/manga, light novels, fantasy, mystery fiction, romance novels, and even subcategories such as cyberpunk, techno-thrillers, and contemporary Christian fiction.

21st century
Since about 2017, issues related to diversity and sensitivity in English-language young adult fiction have become increasingly contentious. Some fans frequently criticize authors – including those who themselves belong to minorities – for "appropriating" or wrongly portraying the experiences of minority or disadvantaged groups.  Publishers have withdrawn several planned young adult novels from publication after they met with pushback on these grounds from readers on websites such as Goodreads. Authors have reported harassment, demands to cease writing, and death threats over social media. To prevent offending readers, publishers increasingly, though with mixed success, employ "sensitivity readers" to screen texts for material that could cause offense.

Themes 
Many young adult novels feature coming-of-age stories. These feature adolescents beginning to transform into adults, working through personal problems, and learning to take responsibility for their actions. YA serves many literary purposes. It provides a pleasurable reading experience for young people, emphasizing real-life experiences and problems in easier-to-grasp ways, and depicts societal functions.

An analysis of YA novels between 1980 and 2000 found seventeen expansive literary themes. The most common of these were friendship, getting into trouble, romantic and sexual interest, and family life. Other common thematic elements revolve around the coming-of-age nature of the texts. This includes narratives about self-identity, life and death, and individuality.

Genre 
There are no distinguishable differences in genre styles between YA fiction and adult fiction.  Some of the most common YA genres include contemporary fiction, fantasy, romance, and dystopian. Hybrid genres are also common in YA.

New adult fiction

Problem novels 

Social problem novels or problem novels are a sub-genre of literature focusing and commenting on overarching social problems. They are typically a type of realistic fiction that characteristically depict contemporary issues such as poverty, drugs, and pregnancy. Published in 1967, S.E. Hinton's The Outsiders is often credited as the first problem novel. Following this release, problem novels were popularized and dominated during the 1970s.

Librarian Sheila Egoff described three reasons why problem novels resonate with adolescents:

 They depict real situations that the readers are experiencing so they have "therapeutic value"
 They are interesting, new and foreign to those not experiencing these issues,
 They feature mature story lines which appeal to a child's desire to grow up.

A classic example of a problem novel and one that defined the sub-genre is Go Ask Alice by Anonymous (pseudonym for Beatrice Sparks) published in 1971. Go Ask Alice is written in first-person as the diary of a young girl who experiences a lot of problems while growing up. In order to cope with her problems, the protagonist begins experimenting with drugs. Modern examples of problem novels include Speak by Laurie Halse Anderson, Crank by Ellen Hopkins, and The Perks of Being a Wallflower by Stephen Chbosky.

Boundaries between children's, young adult, and adult fiction

The distinctions among children's literature, young adult literature, and adult literature have historically been flexible and loosely defined. This line is often policed by adults who feel strongly about the border. At the lower end of the age spectrum, fiction targeted to readers aged 8–12 is referred to as middle grade fiction. Some novels originally marketed to adults are of interest and value to adolescents, and vice versa, as in the case of books such as the Harry Potter series of novels.

Some examples of middle grade novels and novel series include the Percy Jackson & the Olympians series by Rick Riordan, The Underland Chronicles by Suzanne Collins, and Diary of a Wimpy Kid by Jeff Kinney. Some examples of young adult novels and novel series include the Harry Potter series by J. K. Rowling, The Hunger Games trilogy by Suzanne Collins, the Alex Rider series by Anthony Horowitz and the Mortal Instruments series by Cassandra Clare.

Middle grade novels are typically for the ages of 8–12. They are usually shorter, and are significantly less mature and complex in theme and content than YA. YA novels are ages 12–18, and tackle more mature and adult themes and content. Middle grade novels usually feature protagonists between the ages of 10 and 13, whereas young adult novels usually feature protagonists from 14 to 18.

Uses in the classroom
YA has been integrated into classrooms to increase student interest in reading. There is a common misconception that YA lit is solely for "struggling" or "reluctant" readers and should be reserved for remedial classes. Studies have shown that YA can be beneficial in classroom settings. YA fiction is written for adolescents and some believe it to be more relevant to students' social and emotional needs instead of classic literature. Use of YA in classrooms is linked to:

 higher levels of engagement and motivation among students
 increased levels of self-confidence, personal development and self-identification
 increased desire to read similar books

Students who read YA are more likely to appreciate literature and have stronger reading skills than others. YA also allows teachers to talk about "taboo" or difficult topics with their students. For example, a 2014 study shows that using Laurie Halse Anderson's novel Speak aided in discussions on consent and complicity. Those who read about tough situations like date rape are more emotionally prepared to handle the situation if it arises. It is important to use diverse literature in the classroom, especially in discussing taboo topics, to avoid excluding minority students.

Literature written for young adults can also be used as a stepping stone to canonical works that are traditionally read in classrooms, and required by many school curriculums. In Building a Culture of Readers: YA Literature and the Canon by Kara Lycke, Lycke suggests pairing young adult literature and canon works to prepare young adults to understand the classic literature they will encounter. YA can provide familiar and less alienating examples of similar concepts than those in classic literature. Suggested pairings include Rick Riordan's Percy Jackson series with the Iliad or the Odyssey, or Stephenie Meyer's Twilight with Wuthering Heights. When discussing identity, Lycke suggests pairing Hawthorne's The Scarlet Letter with Sherman Alexie's The Absolutely True Diary of a Part-Time Indian.

Criticism

Content 
Mature themes in young adult fiction are often challenged. Conservative activists and religious groups criticize young adult fiction for violence, sexual content, homosexuality, and topics such as suicide. Speculative young adult fiction is sometimes targeted by critics for religious reasons, including religious debates over the Harry Potter series. Criticism is also leveled at young adult fiction authors for alleged insensitivity to marginalized communities or cultural appropriation.

Diversity 

English language young adult fiction and children's literature in general have historically shown a lack of books with a main character who is a person of color, LGBT, or disabled. In the UK 90% of the best-selling YA titles from 2006 to 2016 featured white, able-bodied, cis-gendered, and heterosexual main characters. The numbers of children's book authors have shown a similar lack of diversity. Between 2006–2016, eight percent of all young adult authors published in the UK were people of color.

Some consider diversity beneficial since it encourages children of diverse backgrounds to read and it teaches children of all backgrounds an accurate view of the world around them. In the mid-2010s, more attention was drawn to diversity from various quarters. In the several years following, diversity numbers seem to have increased: One survey showed that in 2017, a quarter of children's books were about minority protagonists, almost a 10% increase from 2016.

Style 
Jack Zipes, a professor of German and literature, has criticized the standardized nature of young adult fiction in Western society. He writes that to become a phenomenon, a work has to "conform to the standards of exception set by the mass media and promoted by the culture industry in general." Zipes notes the similarities between Harry Potter and other well known heroes, such as Superman, David, Tom Thumb, Jack the Giant Killer, Aladdin, and the characters of Horatio Alger.

Chris Crowe, a professor of English and young adult literature, describes criticism of young adult fiction as fear that the genre will replace classic works. He cites the availability of poorly written young adult fiction, as well as the genre's recency making it difficult for it to establish itself against classic literature.

Awards

See also

Citations

General and cited references 
 Cart, Michael (1996). From Romance to Realism: 50 Years of Growth and Change in Young Adult Literature. New York: Harper Collins

External links 

 "In defense of mean-girl books", by Lianne George, Macleans, 15 October 2007. .
 "New Trend in Teen Fiction: Racy Reads; Parents Alarmed that Books are More 'Sex and the City' than Nancy Drew", by Janet Shamlian, NBC News, 15 August 2005.
 "Now and Forever: The Power of Sex in Young Adult Literature ," by Tanya Lee Stone, VOYA, February 2006.
 NPR: "Multicultural Books Offer Diverse Reading Experience" Michel Martin interviews ALA President Loriene Roy, 19 July 2007.
 "Young Adult Fiction: Wild Things" by Naomi Wolf, The New York Times, 12 March 2006.

Young adult fiction
Young adult literature
Fiction by genre